This is a list of events from the year 2020 in North Macedonia.

Incumbents
 President: Stevo Pendarovski
 Prime Minister: Zoran Zaev

Events
 26 February – First confirmed case of COVID-19.
 22 March – First death due to COVID-19.
 27 March – North Macedonia becomes a full member of NATO.
 15 July – 2020 North Macedonian parliamentary election.

References

 
North Macedonia
North Macedonia